Afsar Bitiya (international title: Krishi) is an Indian soap opera which was broadcast on Zee TV from 19 December 2011 to 28 December 2012. Set in Bhagalpur, Bihar, it is the story of Krishna, who rises from modest beginnings to a successful career.

The show was dubbed into English and aired on Zee World for an international audience.

Plot summary
Krishna Raj dreams of becoming a block development officer (BDO). However, her financial status makes it difficult for her to afford a decent education. Her father, Vidyapati Raj, and family have sacrificed to make sure that Krishna receives the education necessary to achieve her goal. The story opens with Krishna rushing to take her first exam towards becoming a BDO. The Tempo gets into an accident, and she is nearly run over by Pintu Singh, the son of the affluent landlord Tun Tun Singh, for whom her father works. However, she makes it there and passes. Thanks to Babloo Singh, the elder son of Tun Tun Singh, Krishna receives free tuition and training at his Coaching Center. However, her mother and brother do not support her efforts to achieve her education.

Moreover, her father's brother, Bihari and his wife Dhahati want their daughter Pinky to become a BDO and have resorted to bribes and other illegal activities to make it possible. The family taunt Vidyapati and his family and the mother and daughter mock Krishna's appearance and call her Koyla Khadaan (Coal Quarry) because of her dark complexion. Pintu Singh admires Krishna's courage and perseverance and becomes her advocate; he makes sure she gets the material she needs to study for her MAINS exam and later in the story assists his brother Babloo Singh and Krishna's father in kidnapping Krishna to take her MAINS exam.

Krishna's mother worries about Swati, Krishna's elder sister, who is not getting married. The family were able to marry off the eldest sister, Manisha, but never fully paid off the dowry and have hardly any to give towards Swati's marriage. A proposal is offered and Bihari takes the opportunity to sabotage Krishna's studies of becoming a BDO and arranges for Swati to get married without a dowry with the offer of Krishna's hand in marriage to the elder widowed brother. The mother reluctantly agrees much to the anger of the father who was not present at the proposal as he is called away on business by Tun Tun Singh. The father's dreams are shattered as Krishna reluctantly agrees to a marriage. She doesn't want her sister's marriage to stop because of her. Babloo Singh comes up with a plan to kidnap Krishna with the help of his younger brother Pintu, who gets her to take her exams in Patna.

While at the testing center Pinky and Dhahati are horrified watching Pintu takes Krishna's hand and drags her to take the exam. Her sister's engagement is subsequently called off. Together, with the help of Babloo and Pintu, Krishna convinces the elder widowed brother to get his father to accept Swati without the dowry for his younger brother. The mother and brother are overjoyed and they eventually move towards encouraging and supporting her in her dreams to become a BDO. In the meantime, Bihari decides to offer Pinky's hand in marriage to Pintu(through the father, Tun Tun Singh). Tun Tun Singh sees this as a good opportunity to have a BDO for a daughter-in-law and tricks Pintu into accepting the marriage. Pintu unwillingly agrees.

At Swati's wedding, Pintu starts to see Krishna in a new light and a fondness for her is developed. This does not go unnoticed, and Dhahati and Bihari poison Tun Tun Singh's mind. They insinuate that Krishna is trying to entice Pintu and her father is behind it. Tun Tun Singh humiliates the family in front of the guests at the wedding. Vidyapati pleads that Tun Tun Singh stop and, when he refuses, he drags him out of the wedding. Pintu is angry not realizing the circumstances behind the incident. Babloo takes the side of Vidyapati. Vidyapati realizes that standing up to Tun Tun Singh has cost him his job and his wife begs that he go and apologize, but Tun Tun Singh degrades Vidyapati and he leaves in shame. Despite the efforts of his wife, Saraswati, to get Tun Tun Singh to rehire her husband, Vidyapati graciously rejects the offer to return to work because of the degradation he has given towards him and, most of all, his daughter is too much to bear. Tun Tun Singh vows to ruin Vidyapati's pride by destroying Krishna, his hope and aspiration.

Krishna passes the MAINS exam and Babloo arranges for her to get some training with the deputy collector, but Tun Tun Singh and Bihari set her up in the act of bribing him and Vidyapati gets arrested. Tun Tun Singh comes to bail him out but Vidyapati knows what has happened and rejects his false offer of support. Krishna pleads with the clerk who set them up to tell the truth but to no avail. Desperate to get her father released, Krishna protests outside the jail and refuses to bribe the police to release him. The police head's daughter is a student at the school where Krishna studies, and she helps her father realize that Krishna is a studious person and one of great principle and character. He releases Vidyapati after she pays for his release, a much smaller amount than the bribe. He reveals the truth about it after admiring Krishna's perseverance and determination to follow the path of the law and not cave into bribery. Overjoyed, Krishna starts to prepare for her final exam with the help of her family.

In the meantime, her brother Ravi takes up a job as a laborer to support the family and the father finds another job. Financially secure, Krishna focuses on her education; she has to reject help from Babloo as she realizes that his father, Tun Tun Singh, has only her destruction in mind. Babloo is saddened that he cannot be there for his favorite student, and Krishna is heartbroken at losing the guidance of her mentor. With all the recent events, Tun Tun Singh is now further angered and determined to punish Vidyapati for disgracing him, refusing his job offer and humiliating him at the jail by making sure Krishna never becomes a BDO.

Pintu and Krishna's chances of a romance are strained. While in jail, he demeans Vidyapati in his attempts to defend his father. Krishna refuses to tolerate it and speaks out. Later their encounters are faced with silence. However, an incident at the movie theatre where Krishna speaks out in his defence suddenly reminds him of her strong principles and character. A sound talk from Sargum, Babloo's wife and Pintu's sister-in-law, helps remind him that Krishna is a far better person than is wife-to-be (Pinky) who stood there quietly.

Pintu is now pressured to meet with Pinky who is totally besotted with him. He cannot stand her or her family and is forced to escort them to Patna for the final examination. Pinky's father has "prepared" her by inviting the deputy collector to train her. Krishna, with the help of her younger sister Chanchal, eavesdrop outside the window to hear the training techniques. It is evident that Pinky has not prepared or is ready to sit the exam. She is a spoilt brat and is relying on her father's bribes to become a BDO. Feeling that she is doing something wrong and against her own principles, Krishna opens up to the deputy collector and apologizes for listening in on the lessons without his permission.

Krishna and her father travel to Patna for the final stage of the exam. However, unbeknownst to her, Tun Tun Singh and Bihari have bribed two of the examiners to make sure that Krishna fails and Pinky passes. While in the waiting room at the bus station, Krishna's bag containing her admission card is stolen. Krishna eventually finds the person who stole her bag. She makes it to the center just in time to sit the exam. Pintu has bribed the name-caller to bump her name up so that she is last to be called and won't miss her interview. When she gets there, at Babloo's insistence, Pintu gives her his handkerchief to wipe her face. This horrifies Pinky, whose interview was a disaster but seems unaffected by it.

The exam panel includes the deputy collector who had Vidyapati arrested. Krishna passes the exam and impresses the panel including the two examiners who have been bribed. They realize that it is going to be tough to fail Krishna. One of the examiners praises Krishna in front of everyone. Everyone applauds, including Pintu, much to Pinky's anger. Krishna learns what Pintu did for her so she could sit the exam. Babloo gives Krishna and her father a ride back to their hometown while Pinky and her family are taken home by a driver of the family. At the house she sees Pintu accidentally holds Krishna's hand when he tries to help her catch a falling file. Pinky and her family watch in shock.

Devastated at the outcome of her interview, the fact Pintu rejects her, and that Krishna is getting all the attention, she attempts suicide(superficial cuts to the wrist). Krishna gets her medical attention(as seen by Pintu who admires her even more) when the doctors refuse to tend to her. However, Dhahati does not recognize her efforts and instead degrades and insults Krishna in front of everyone. Pintu explodes and drags her away from the abuse. His family and Krisha and Pinky's families watch, speechless. Bihari pressures Tun Tun to move the engagement forward; the next day Pintu and Pinky are engaged. To rub salt in Krishna's wound, who has now come to realize her feelings for Pintu, Dhahati and Pinky make her dress Pinky and embarrass and humiliate her.

The day after the engagement, Krishna, Chanchal and Ravi run into Pintu and his nephew at a restaurant by chance. Pinky comes to hear that they are together, storms in, and insults Krishna. Pintu cannot stand it and speaks up in her defence. At the restaurant Pintu confides in Krishna that he does not want to go through with the marriage but is under pressure from his father. It appears that it is in part to stop the accusations Krishna has had to endure.

The BDO final results are made public and to Krishna's shock, Pinky becomes BDO. Everyone is horrified. Tun Tun Singh and Bihari are overjoyed that their bribery has worked. Pinky is now going to be the bahu of Tun Tun Singh's home and Tun Tun Singh will use her position as BDO to abuse his own power. Pintu is further pressured to go ahead with the marriage with Pinky, and he must be married before she becomes BDO. Babloo, Sargum and Pintu's mother are all aware that Pintu is forced into the marriage. None of them know how to stand up against the tyrant Tun Tun Singh without any serious repercussions on them. However, they are not going to give up and are determined to find a way out for Pintu. Meanwhile, Krishna decides to protest her results and goes to Patna to request that an investigation take place.

Finally, during the wedding of Pinky and Pintu, Pintu witnesses the true face of Tun Tun Singh. Pintu realizes that it was Tun Tun Singh all along and he was behind all of the devastation of Krishna. Hurt and angry, Pintu calls off the wedding, leaving Pinky heartbroken. He goes to Patna and helps Krishna take a re-investigation of her BDO exam with Babloo Singh and Krishna's father. The investigation BDO exam is done in public, and Krishna is elected as the BDO. Everyone is happy, including Krishna, Pintu, Babloo, Krishna's father, Krishna's family, Pintu mother, and Babloo wife, and Krishna's village people. However, Tun Tun Singh, Pinky, and Pinky's family is upset with Krishna being elected as BDO. Pinky and Pinky's father vow to destroy Krishna's career as a BDO.

Krishna goes through a BDO graduation for 6 months. Finally, Krishna has graduated and has become a BDO. She starts her work the very next day. However, there are many problems which Krishna is encountering as a BDO. Now, Krishna is married to Pintu Singh. They experience racism problems because of Pintu's fair skin and Krishna's dark completion. Sikka Thakurain enters in the life of Tuntun's family. She is a corrupt woman who has illegal ownership over a huge piece land, she along with Tun Tun Singh start causing problems in Krishna's life, because of them, Krishna is falsely accused of being corrupt and given a chance to prove herself innocent.

Krishna finds evidences against Sikka Thakurain which makes the former decides to kill the latter. Sikka sends goons to shoot Krishna but Krishna's father and sister-in-law (Babloo's wife) get killed. There is mourning of their deaths where Krishna's widowed mother asks Krishna to leave her in-laws and live with them for her safety. Krishna has to agree when Pintu forces her. Because of Sikka's false accusation, Krishna is forced to resign from the BDO post. To her shock, she finds out that Pinky has taken up the position as BDO.

Then, Pintu suggests Krishna to become an IAS officer to which she agrees. At the same time Pinky tries to create problems for Krishna and Pintu. Finally she plans to destroy them by marrying Babloo. She uses Sonu (Babloo's son) as a trump card. Krishna and Pintu try to stop the marriage because according to the kundli if Babloo and Pinky marry it can cause Babloo's life to be in danger but Babloo misunderstands her and asks her not to interfere in his life. Krishna decides to enter Pintu's house, leaving her dream to be an IAS officer. But none other than Pintu and Krishna knew this. Krishna gets pregnant. Pinky starts creating problems for Krishna to make her get out of the house. She also makes Babloo send his son, Sonu, to a hostel. Krishna and Pintu overcome every obstacle made by Pinky much to her disappointment. At the end, Pinky becomes very nice and Krishna gives birth to a baby girl and all the family are happy.

Cast

Main cast
 Mitali Nag as Krishna Raj/ Krishna Pintu Singh
 Kinshuk Mahajan as Pintu Singh

Recurring cast
 Virendra Saxena as Vidyapati Raj, Krishna's father 
 Shahbaz Khan as Tuntun Singh, Pintu's father
 Yash Sinha as Babloo Singh, Pintu's elder brother
 Shivshakti Sachdev as Priyanka ‘‘Pinky’’ Raj, Dehati & Bihari's daughter, Krishna's cousin
 Monica Khanna as Swati Raj, Krishna's second elder sister
 Mak Mukesh Tripathi as Mahesh, Swati's Husband
 Tanya Sharma as Chanchal Raj, Krishna's younger sister 
 Meena Mir as Saraswati Vidyapati Raj, Krishna's mother
 Prachee Pathak as Dehati Bihari Raj, Krishna's aunt, Bihari's wife
 Neeraj Sood as Bihari Raj, Krishna's uncle, Vidyapati's younger brother
 Indira Krishnan as Ganga Devi/ Ganga Tuntun Singh, Pintu's mother
 Neha Prajapati as Manisha Raj, Krishna's elder sister
 Ashwini Kalsekar as Sikka Thakurain
 Soni Sharma as Anchor

Development

Reception

Critics
The Indian Express rated three stars and stated it as a must watch series.

Ratings
The series opened with a rating of 1.9 TVR. As in February 2012, it garnered 1.7 TVR. As in July 2012, it garnered a low ratings ranging 0.8 and 0.9 TVR. The series ended with 2 TVR.

References

External links
 Official Website

Zee TV original programming
Indian television soap operas
2011 Indian television series debuts
2012 Indian television series endings
Television shows set in Bihar
Fictional portrayals of the Bihar Police